Deschalers is a surname. Notable people with the surname include:

 John Deschalers
 Thomas Deschalers